Chatham Saw Mill is the saw mill situated in Chatham Island  of Andaman   and   Nicobar  Islands in India. It was set up in 1883 with the primary objective to meet the local requirements of saw and timber for the constructional works. It is owned by the state government. It is Asia’s largest and oldest saw mill. It is connected to Port Blair by a 100 meter long bridge.

Gallery

References
https://www.helloscholar.in/chatham-saw-mill-and-chatham-island/
Economy of the Andaman and Nicobar Islands
Sawmills
Government of the Andaman and Nicobar Islands